Nalakgala or nalaxdlala, meaning "hind end up river", was a Kwakwaka'wakw village at the head of Hoeya Sound on the north side of Knight Inlet in British Columbia.  This was a place of origin for the Walas group, but by 1914 the village site and associated harvesting area was claimed by the Mamalilikulla.

See also
List of Kwakwaka'wakw villages

References

Kwakwaka'wakw villages
Central Coast of British Columbia